The Conquest of Southern Han by Song occurred in 971, when Northern Song forces captured the Southern Han capital of Guangzhou in present-day Guangdong Province.

References 

970s conflicts
971
Wars involving the Song dynasty
Wars of the Five Dynasties and Ten Kingdoms
Southern Han